Henry Lawrence may refer to:

 Henry Lawrence (President of the Council) (1600–1664), English statesman who served as President of the English Council of State
 Sir Henry Montgomery Lawrence (1806–1857), British soldier and statesman
 Henry F. Lawrence (1868–1950), American politician from Missouri
 Henry Lawrence (American football) (born 1951), American former American football player
 Henry Arnold Lawrence (1848–1902), English rugby union player 
 Henry Sherwood Lawrence (1916–2004), American immunologist
 Henry Staveley Lawrence (1870–1949), governor of Bombay, 1926–1928
 Henry Lawrence (footballer) (born 2001), English association footballer

See also
 Harry Lawrence (disambiguation)